The Frankleben hoard is a significant hoard deposit of the European Bronze Age, associated with the Unstrut group (associated with the Tumulus or early Urnfield culture (ca. 1500–1250 BC). The site is in the Geisel valley, formed by a minor tributary of the Saale River.
It was discovered in 1946 in a brown coal pit near Frankleben, now a part of  Braunsbedra municipality,  Saxony-Anhalt, Germany.

The hoard consists of three ceramic vessels, buried alongside one another. One of the vessels was destroyed by a coal dredger at the time of discovery. 
The finds consist of a total of about 45 kg of bronze artefacts, most of them sickles, alongside some axeheads.

The discovery was made by the operator of the coal dredger, Anton Wesp, in the "Michael  Vesta" pit (now flooded and part of Runstedter See south of Frankleben, just off the BAB 38 highway). Wesp's dredger destroyed the first vessel almost completely in June 1946 (find I). 
Wesp returned to the site on 5 July 1946 and discovered a second vessel (find II), from which he was able to save 93 sickles and two axeheads. Wesp examined the site and found a third vessel (find III), containing 130 sickles and 12 axeheads. Find III is thus the best preserved, and its original arrangement was recorded. The sickles were deposited in a helix or fan-like arrangement, and the axeheads were laid on top of the sickles.

The original hoard probably contained more than 300 such bronze sickles  of the so-called Knopfsichel ("knob-sickle") type, of which 237 came into the possession of the Halle State Museum of Prehistory.
An analysis of the hoard was published by Wilhelm Albert von Brunn in 1958. Von Brunn distinguished 91 types of sickles, originating from 182 individual moulds. 179 out of the total of 237 sickles show traces of use. On the sickle blades are patterns. 
Von Brunn interpreted them as marks or pictograms identifying the sickle-maker. 
By contrast Sommerfeld (1994) suggested that the patterns represent numeral signs.
Sommerfeld further suggested that beyond their obvious usefulness as a tool (as indicated by the traces of use),  bronze sickles during the Urnfield period had acquired a secondary function as commodity money.

Knob-sickles of the Frankleben type were found in four other hoards in the middle Saale  region. The tradition of depositing bronze artefacts in hoards in this region predates the Urnfield culture, reaching back to the beginning of the 2nd millennium BC. These early hoards consist of axes, while the Urnfield period hoards are dominated by sickles, even though a smaller number of axes was still included alongside the sickles. In the later Bronze Age, the tradition of hoards is continued, but the sickles are in turn replaced by jewelry such as arm-rings.

Numerals

An analysis of the Frankleben hoard found that markings on the sickles constituted a numeral system related to the lunar calendar. According to the Halle State Museum of Prehistory:

Literature 

Wilhelm Albert von Brunn, Der Schatz von Frankleben und die mitteldeutschen Sichelfunde, Prähistorische Zeitschrift  26 (1958), 1-70. 
Christoph Sommerfeld: Gerätegeld Sichel. Studien zur monetären Struktur bronzezeitlicher Horte im nördlichen Mitteleuropa (Vorgeschichtliche Forschungen Bd. 19), Berlin/New York 1994 
Bettina Stoll-Tucker: Mondsicheln in der Erde. In: Landesamt für Archäologie Sachsen-Anhalt, Landesmuseum für Vorgeschichte (Hrsg.): Schönheit, Macht und Tod. 120 Funde aus 120 Jahren Landesmuseum für Vorgeschichte Halle. Begleitband zur Sonderausstellung vom 11. Dezember 2001 bis 28. April 2002 im Landesmuseum für Vorgeschichte Halle/Saale.
Marco Chiriaco, Der Hortfund von Frankleben: Ein Sichelmassenhort im chronologischen und geographischen Kontext sowie seine Bedeutung (2009),

External links
Masses of Sickles (Landesmuseum für Vorgeschichte Halle). Has a close-up of marks on a sickle and a list of the marks.
Depotfund von Frankleben (Landesmuseum für Vorgeschichte Halle). Photos of the Frankleben Hoard.
A previously unknown rag axe from the hoard complex of Frankleben (Landesmuseum für Vorgeschichte Halle). In German, with pictures of the hoard during salvage.

2nd-millennium BC works
1946 archaeological discoveries
Treasure troves of Germany
Archaeology of Saxony-Anhalt
Bronze Age sites in Europe
Indo-European archaeological artifacts
Archaeological discoveries in Germany
Bronze Age Germany
Urnfield culture
Tumulus culture